The Rivière la Quinte is a river of Haiti.

See also
List of rivers of Haiti

References

Rivers of Haiti